The Rockford Files is an American television drama series starring James Garner that aired on the  NBC network between September 13, 1974, and January 10, 1980, and has remained in syndication to the present day. Garner portrays Los Angeles-based private investigator Jim Rockford with Noah Beery, Jr., in the supporting role of his father, a retired truck driver nicknamed "Rocky".

The series debuted with a made-for-TV movie simply titled The Rockford Files. During the series run, there were a number of two-part episodes, as well as long (90 or 120 minutes) episodes that were split into two parts for syndication (and on later DVD releases). Filming stopped in the middle of the sixth season (1979–80), on the advice of star James Garner's doctor. Garner, who had filmed many of his own stunts, had injured his back and knees and also developed an ulcer.

In the 1990s, after the settlement of several long-running legal actions between Garner's Cherokee Productions and Universal Studios, Rockford returned to the air in a series of eight TV movies on CBS.

Series overview

Episodes

TV movie pilot (1974)
"Backlash of the Hunter", starring James Garner (as Jim Rockford), Joe Santos (as Dennis Becker), and Stuart Margolin (as Angel Martin) all debut in their series roles.  Also featured is Robert Donley as Joseph "Rocky" Rockford, a role that would be recast in the subsequent series. Lindsay Wagner plays the role of Sara Butler.

Season 1 (1974–75)

James Garner stars as Jim Rockford, and Noah Beery as his father Rocky.  Joe Santos is a frequent recurring guest as Dennis Becker.  Gretchen Corbett appears on a recurring basis as Beth.  Stuart Margolin appears only twice as Angel, but his appearances will become more frequent as the series continues.  Tom Atkins is seen on a recurring basis as Lt. Diehl.

Season 2 (1975–76)

Garner, Beery and Santos are now all billed as stars.  Corbett, Margolin and Atkins are frequently recurring guests.

Season 3 (1976–77)

Garner, Beery and Santos are the series stars. Corbett and Margolin are frequently recurring guests. James Luisi begins his recurring role as Lt. Chapman.

Season 4 (1977–78)

Garner, Beery and Santos are the series stars. Corbett, Luisi and Margolin are frequently recurring guests, though Corbett leaves the show halfway through the season. Atkins returns for one episode.

Season 5 (1978–79)

Garner, Beery and Santos star. Luisi and Margolin are frequently recurring guests.  Bo Hopkins is a recurring guest as John Cooper for this season only.

Season 6 (1979–80)

Garner, Beery and Santos star. Luisi and Margolin are frequently recurring guests.

Unproduced
The following four episodes were scripted and slated for production during season six.  However, when Garner was forced to leave the series due to medical issues, the series was shut down and these episodes were never filmed.

 · "Happy Father's Day" by Mark Griffiths
 · "Some People Are Trouble" by Shel Willens
 · "Never Trust a Boxx Boy" by Stephen J. Cannell
 · "What Do You Want From Us?" by Juanita Bartlett

CBS TV movies

Writers
Stephen J. Cannell and Roy Huggins  John Thomas James
They created the Rockford files together and wrote many episodes together and separately.
Robert Hamner
Gloryette Clark
Edward J. Lakso
Juanita Bartlett
Gordon Dawson
David Chase
David C. Taylor
Rudolph Borchert
Shel Willens
Rogers Turrentine
James Crocker
William R. Stratton
Charles Sailor 
Eric Kaldor

Directors
William Wiard 
directed 26 episodes

Lawrence Doheny 
directed 12 episodes
Ivan Dixon

Directed 8 episodes
Jerry London
Directed 8 episodes

Reza Badiyi
Directed 7 episodes
Russ Mayberry
Directed 7 episodes

Meta Rosenberg
Directed 6 episodes

Jackie Cooper
Directed 5 episodes

Lou Antonio
Directed 3 episodes
Corey Allen
Directed 3 episodes
Stephen J. Cannell
Directed 3 episodes

John Patterson
Directed 2 episodes
Jeannot Szwarc
Directed 2 episodes
Vincent McEveety
Directed 2 episodes
Stuart Margolin (Angel Martin)
Directed 2 episodes

Joseph Pevney
Directed 1 episode
Michael Schultz
Directed 1 episode
Bernhard Kowalski
Directed 1 episode
Alex Grasshoff
Directed 1 episode
Charles S. Dubin
Directed 1 episode
Winrich Kolbe
Directed 1 episode
James Coburn
Directed 1 episode
James Garner
Directed 1 episode
Richard Crenna
Directed 1 episode

External links
 List of episodes at imdb.com

Rockford Files
The Rockford Files